The following is a list of countries with their first Major League Baseball player. Listed are each country that at least one current or former major league player was born in, along with the name of the first person born in that country to play in a major league game, and the year and sports league of that player's major league debut.

Background
The globalization of baseball has been occurring since its inception. After an influx of players from western Europe in early years, the major leagues came to see fewer European players and more players from Latin America. Players born in over 50 countries and on every continent except Antarctica have now appeared in major league games. Considerations:

 The list is based on players' birthplaces and each location's current country, per detailed records at Baseball-Reference.com.
 For example, a player born in Berlin would be included with other players born in present-day Germany, even if when the player was born it might have been part of East Germany or West Germany.
 The countries listed are generally consistent with those that compete in the Olympic Games. For example, Guam, Puerto Rico, and the U.S. Virgin Islands appear in the list.

 The players listed are not necessarily the first citizen of a country to play in a major league game, as nationality is determined under a country's nationality law and may differ.
 The list does not reflect where players grew up and learned to play baseball.
 Some players on the list, despite their birth location, are or were Americans or Canadians who returned to their parents' home country as children and were raised there. One example is Harry Kingman, who was born in China but grew up in California.
 Many European-born players on the list moved to North America as children. For example, the first person born in Italy to play in the major leagues, Lou Polli in 1932, moved with his family to Vermont at seven months of age.

List
Listed players appeared in at least one game of a professional baseball major league (commonly referred to as Major League Baseball, although that entity did not exist before 1903), which encompasses:

American Association (1882–1891)
American League (1901–present)
Federal League (1913–1915)
National Association (1871–1875)
National League (1876–present)
Players' League (1890)
Union Association (1884)

Note that the status of the National Association as a major league is in dispute. National Association players are included in the major league records of sites such as Baseball-Reference.com and Retrosheet, thus are also included here.

 Hall and Wright both made their debut on 5 May 1871.
 There were 18 players–all born in the United States–in the first game of the National Association, played on 4 May 1871.

Notes

See also
List of current Major League Baseball players by nationality

References

External links
 Player Place of Birth and Death at Baseball-Reference.com
 The Directory of Birth, Death and Cemetery Locations at Retrosheet

Nati

Countries with their first Major League Baseball player
Major League Baseball player, first